Benedicta of Bjelbo (Swedish: Bengta Sunesdotter; died 1261) was a Swedish noblewoman and a central figure in the incident known as the Maiden Abduction from Vreta, wherein she, like her mother, Princess Helen of Sweden before her, and her daughter, Ingrid Svantepolksdotter after her, was abducted from Vreta Abbey (Vreta kloster) by the man she later married. Her abduction was the subject of the folksong "Bridal Abduction of Young Lars" (Junker Lars klosterrov).

Biography
Benedicta was the daughter of Princess Helen and Sune Folkesson. She was the sister of Queen Catherine of Sweden. Benedicta was placed in Vreta Abbey for her education. In 1244, she was abducted by Lars Petersson, Justiciar of Östergötland, with whom she traveled to Norway. One theory is that Lars  was a grandson of a king of the St. Eric dynasty and wished to unite that dynasty with Benedicta's Sverker dynasty. He may also have had designs on the throne. Benedicta lived with Lars in Norway for several years. After his death, she returned to Sweden and married high nobleman Svantepolk Knutsson, Lord of Viby, with whom she had several daughters, among them Ingrid  and a son, Canute, who died childless.

References

Other sources
Agneta Conradi Mattsson  (1998) Riseberga kloster, Birger Brosa & Filipssönerna  (Vetenskapliga skrifter utgivna av Örebro läns museum) 
Dick Harrison  (2002) Jarlens sekel - En berättelse om 1200-talets Sverige (Ordfront, Stockholm)

Related reading
Mia Korpiola (2009) Between Betrothal and Bedding: Marriage Formation in Sweden 1200-1600 (BRILL) 

1261 deaths
13th-century Swedish women
13th-century Swedish nobility
Year of birth missing
House of Bjelbo